Doctor Light is a superhero appearing in comic books published by DC Comics. Kimiyo Hoshi is a distinct character from the villain of the same name. She has, however, crossed paths with the villainous Doctor Light on several occasions.

Doctor Light appeared in the sixth season of the television series The Flash, portrayed by Emmie Nagata.

Publication history
Doctor Light first appeared in Crisis on Infinite Earths #4 and was created by Marv Wolfman and George Pérez.

Fictional character biography
Kimiyo Tazu Hoshi, a brilliant but overly-driven scientist, was the supervising astronomer at an observatory in Japan, overseeing a group of astronomers charting the unnatural effects of the Crisis on Infinite Earths. She is also a medical doctor, as shown in Justice League Annual #3 (1989) and Justice League America #55 (October 1991).

As the Crisis continued, Hoshi's fascination with the phenomenon grew into an obsession while the men grew concerned for their safety. Disgusted by their mounting fear, Hoshi arrogantly insulted them and ordered an evacuation, leaving her to study the Crisis alone through her telescope.

Meanwhile, the Monitor, a being linked with all positive matter, senses his enemy, the Anti-Monitor, absorbing yet another positive-matter Earth with his antimatter cloud. To tip the scales for the heroes of the positive universe, the Monitor activates one last warrior.

He sends a devastating beam of energy from the star Vega to Earth, which strikes the observing Hoshi, leaving massive destruction in its wake. Granted the power of photonics and the name Doctor Light, Hoshi is assigned by the Monitor to guard one of the vibrational forks needed to save the Earth. Teen Titans member Starfire and Outsiders member Halo set out to destroy the machine. Since Doctor Light can't speak to them in English, she resorts to blasting them away from the machine. Superman is the first to communicate with her, given his knowledge of most of Earth's languages.

Once the Earth's heroes and villains are brought aboard the Monitor's satellite, the Japanese-speaking Katana takes over as Kimiyo's translator.

Doctor Light, granted the ability to understand English, accompanies several heroes to the anti-matter universe to confront the Anti-Monitor. She and Superman soon discover the machines that the villain has deployed to destroy the remaining Earths. The Anti-Monitor ambushes the Man of Steel; Doctor Light defends Superman as best she can. Supergirl arrives, and sacrifices her life, allowing Doctor Light to carry the unconscious Superman to safety.

Seeing Supergirl's sacrifice makes Doctor Light realize how selfish she has been, and she resolves to change.

When Harbinger summons her to fight in the final battle, Doctor Light is ready. As the other heroes barrage the Anti-Monitor, she absorbs the energy of a gigantic star that he is using as a power source. Scoring the first fall of the Anti-Monitor during that battle, she blasts a gaping hole through him.

In the post-Crisis continuity, Supergirl was written out of existence, so it is explained that Doctor Light was inspired by the other heroes.

She is potentially one of the most powerful superheroes in the DC Universe, but she has not tapped into the heightened levels of power she used during the Crisis (although few remember those events, Doctor Light is one of the few who do, seeing as how she once mentioned in Showcase '96 #9 (October 1996) that she's faced "Anti-Matter Gods").

Doctor Light has joined the Justice League a few times over the years, most notably as a member of Justice League Europe during the latter half of its incarnation. She also joined an incarnation of the Doom Patrol for a period of time. During her time on the Justice League Europe, she believed that her anti-social attitude during the Crisis was due to the food she regularly ate, after Power Girl is diagnosed with a similar condition. However, her behavior in Crisis was, in fact, her genuine behavior. While a member of the Justice League, Doctor Light formed significant friendships with The Flash (Wally West) and Power Girl. There is a protracted period of animosity with the member of the Global Guardians known as Rising Sun. His romantic endeavours win out and the two enter into a relationship

Infinite Crisis and after

In Green Arrow (vol. 3) #54 (November 2005), following his recovery from the mind-wipe he suffered at the hands of the Justice League, Arthur Light, the villainous male Doctor Light attacked Doctor Hoshi and drained her of her powers.

It appeared that her de-powerment was temporary; in Infinite Crisis #5 (February 2006) she used her powers to aid in the evacuation of Tokyo, Japan. In that same issue she was warned by Bart Allen, in the costume of the Silver Age Flash, of the escape of an enraged Superboy-Prime. She was later seen in Infinite Crisis #7 (April 2006) battling the evil Doctor Light.

A flashback in Action Comics #838 (June 2006) reveals that Doctor Light and The Ray, heroes possessing solar-based powers, took part in an unsuccessful attempt to re-activate Superman's powers.

One Year Later and 52
An article discussing the destruction of Star City (and, by extension, Kimiyo's loss of power) appeared at the 52 website, which is designed to complement the weekly comic series. The article places a date on the city's destruction, which was depicted in the final 2 Pre-OYL Green Arrow arcs, specifying that the event took place on May 15. Problematically, this dating places the story after the events depicted in Infinite Crisis.

Given this dating, Kimiyo's loss of power took place during the events of 52 - Week 2 which, given Kimiyo and Green Arrow's appearances at the end of 52 - Week 1, would appear to make sense, although it in turn makes nonsense of information contained in Green Arrow vol. 3, #54, where it is revealed that Kimiyo has not used her powers for two years.

The story arc also concludes with Green Arrow experiencing a strange multiplying effect that places the story during Infinite Crisis, not two weeks after the event's conclusion (several other characters in the DCU experienced this effect in the issue of their titles that immediately preceded the OYL jump).

Kimiyo Hoshi appeared in costume in 52 Week 35, alongside various other heroes. All are assisting the injured victims of Lex Luthor, who had caused a rain of 'supermen' by deactivating their powers. She is also shown in 52 Week 50, in the climactic battle of World War III.

Dr. Light appears in World War III: United We Stand, the fourth issue of the World War III mini-series that coincided with 52 Week 50. She is one of the first wave of heroes who confront (and are taken down by) Black Adam. He grasps her neck with such force that she instantly blacks out; he throws her aside.

Geoff Johns has revealed on his message board that he was working on storylines involving Doctor Light.

Oracle invites Kimiyo to join the Birds of Prey (issue #100), but she was not selected to take part in the first mission. She does, however, appear in Birds of Prey #113 (January 2008), assisting Oracle by scanning the electromagnetic spectrum for any evidence that might lead her to the parties responsible for an influx of hi-tech weaponry being smuggled into Metropolis. She is unable to locate any such evidence.

Doctor Light is only occasionally active in the superhero community because she is a single mother with two children: Imako, her daughter, and Yasu, her son. Gail Simone confirmed in a chat on comicbloc.com that Kimiyo's children have not been retconned out of existence by the recent changes to DC continuity (that resulted from the transformation of the Post Crisis Earth into "New Earth" during Infinite Crisis).

Doctor Light works in S.T.A.R. Labs and has an interior monologue about the erratic fluctuations in her powers that lead to her retirement from being a superhero. Upon returning home from work, she is ambushed by the Dakota-based super-team the Shadow Cabinet. After briefly talking with the heroes, she becomes enraged and attacks them after coming to believe they have harmed her children, only to be quickly neutralized and kidnapped by the team. This is later revealed to have been orchestrated by Superman and Icon, as a way for both Shadow Cabinet and the League to gain information on each other. Hardware uses the candle that was once Arthur Light (Arthur having been recently killed by the Spectre) to restore Kimiyo's powers, allowing her to quickly defeat a powered-up Shadow Thief and his master, a restored and more powerful Starbreaker.

Kimiyo has been confirmed to be a member of the newest incarnation of the Justice League. In the Blackest Night crossover, Kimiyo and the remaining members of the League arrive at the Hall of Justice to find Firestorm after hearing of the Black Lantern attacks taking place across the globe. Upon entering the Hall, Kimiyo senses the presence of her villainous counterpart, and separates from the group, believing this Black Lantern is hers alone to face. Kimiyo soon finds herself at the mercy of the Black Lantern Arthur Light. Although initially her powers seem to be ineffectual against the Black Lantern Light, when he threatens the lives of her children, Kimiyo manages to generate a light strong enough to destroy him and his black ring. She then proceeds to do the same to the Black Lantern versions of former JLA members Steel and Vibe, before passing out.

In the aftermath of the ordeal, Vixen tells Kimiyo that she is taking a leave of absence from the team to recover from her injuries. With Red Tornado destroyed, John Stewart temporarily offworld, and Firestorm unable to return to the team, Kimi is left with no members for the JLA. Luckily, she is approached by Donna Troy, who joins the team alongside her friends Cyborg, Dick Grayson, and Starfire. With the costume given to her by Hardware destroyed, Kimiyo designs a new one, and then travels to Metropolis to recruit Mon-El and the Guardian. Kimiyo briefly appears during the War of the Supermen, where she and the rest of the JLA attempt to repel General Zod's invasion forces.

After just three issues together, the new JLA team loses most of its members, with Kimiyo temporarily leaving the team to be with her children. Back in Metropolis, Kimiyo helps Supergirl rescue her friend Lana Lang after her body is possessed by the Insect Queen. A short time later, Kimiyo and Gangbuster investigate an object that crashes into a Metropolis park and leaves a massive crystallized crater in its center. While searching the crater, the two heroes discover a Bizarro-like creature that resembles Supergirl. Before Kimiyo can call for help, the creature lashes out and attacks her. The Bizarro Supergirl takes Kimiyo and her associates hostage, but is ultimately defeated in battle by the real Supergirl. It is revealed that the Bizarro Supergirl is a refugee from the cube-shaped Bizarro World, and was sent to Earth by her cousin after their planet was attacked by a being known as the Godship. Kimiyo attempts to take the Bizarro Supergirl to S.T.A.R. Labs, only to be knocked unconscious by Supergirl, who then absconds with her doppelganger and her ship, hoping to stop the Godship and save Bizarro World.

Despite resigning from active duty, Doctor Light appears as one of the numerous heroes assembled at Washington, D.C. to break an energy dome trapping the Justice League and the Crime Syndicate of America within the city, as well as a member of the JLA's reserve roster during the team's battle against Eclipso. She also assists the League (as well as several other teams) during a battle against the Secret Six, where she is gunned down by Deadshot.

DC Rebirth
Kimiyo appears in the Rebirth storyline Heroes in Crisis and is among many superheroes that are interviewed in the Sanctuary, a therapeutic facility to help heroes deal with the emotional costs of their pursuits. Kimiyo is revealed to be Arthur Light's ex-wife, as previously mentioned in the Trinity War storyline, and mother of their three children Tommy, Emma and Sakura.

Powers and abilities
Exposure to energy from the star Vega granted Doctor Light photokinesis: control over all forms of light sources, without relying on equipment. She can absorb all forms of illumination as energy, which allowed her to survive Starbreaker's attack, as well as absorb the energy of the sun to attack the Anti-Monitor. She can project energy, allowing her to shoot destructive laser beams and other blasts of destructive energy, blind her opponents with blinding flashes of light (capable of dispersing Shadow Thief's shadow constructs), and create protective barriers. She can focus photons into "hard light" (a fictional form of energy which acts like a solid object). She can refract lightwaves to create holographic images. She can turn into light, rendering her invisible to the naked eye. Her abilities also allow her to disperse radiation and holographic illusions, scan and "see" the electromagnetic spectrum, track ionized molecules, and convert her body to near light to minimize her mass and escape gravitational pull. She can sense the light around her, which she describes as a "sixth sense" allowing her to know when somebody enters the room. She can ride lightwaves to fly, capable of reaching the speed of light, and outrunning the Superman of Earth-1. She has used her powers to generate sunlight from a yellow sun to heal injured Kryptonians and Daxamites. Her light abilities appear to have granted her enhanced durability, as she has survived attacks that have knocked out Power Girl and other enhanced metahumans. She can also teleport, from Earth to the Watchtower.

Outside of her light-based abilities, she is also a brilliant scientific mind; in early appearances, she considered herself a scientist foremost and superhero second. She is a prominent astronomer, the world's foremost authority on light technology. She even ran S.T.A.R. Labs for a time. On several occasions, she has also displayed knowledge of medicine. Conversations with Batman have also revealed knowledge of Asian martial arts, if not the ability to use it effectively in combat.

Her primary weakness is that she requires a light source to fuel her powers, and being placed in an area of absolute darkness severely weakens her abilities; she can, however, store energy for such occasions. Her other weakness is that she's afraid of the dark. On occasions when she has been surrounded by unnatural darkness, Kimiyo has been able to use logic to overcome her fear and win the day.

Other versions

JLA/The 99
Doctor Light appears as a major character and member of the Justice League in the JLA/The 99 limited series, which takes place in an alternate continuity where the characters of the DC Universe and Teshkeel Comics coexist on the same world. Along with Vixen, Doctor Light is touted as an example of the racial and cultural diversity that the League encompasses.

Teen Titans (animated series tie-in comics)
The Kimiyo Hoshi version of Doctor Light made a cameo in the tie-in comic to the Teen Titans animated series. In an alternate universe, she serves as the heroic counterpart to Titans villain Doctor Light and is allied with the Brotherhood of Justice to stop the Teen Tyrants.

Flashpoint
In the alternate timeline of the Flashpoint event, Dr. Kimiyo Hoshi is a member of the H.I.V.E. council. She voted against using nuclear weapons to end the war in Western Europe between Aquaman and Wonder Woman.

DC Bombshells
In an alternate history version of World War II, Kimiyo Hoshi is the chief scientist for Amanda Waller's Bombshells project. She acts as one of Kate Kane's handlers. In addition, she has powers similar to her mainstream counterparts and is in a romantic relationship with Big Barda.

In other media

Television

 Doctor Light appears in Justice League Unlimited, voiced by Lauren Tom. This version is a member of an expanded Justice League.
 Two versions of Doctor Light appear in the live-action Arrowverse series The Flash:
 The first version appears in season two, portrayed by Malese Jow. This version is the Earth-2 doppelgänger of Linda Park, and a metahuman criminal working for Zoom.
 Kimiyo Hoshi / Doctor Light appears in season six, portrayed by Emmie Nagata. She is a metahuman assassin who works for the organization Black Hole before being swayed to Eva McCulloch's side.
 Doctor Light makes a non-speaking appearance in the Justice League Action episode "Party Animal".

Film
 An alternate universe version of Kimiyo Hoshi appears in Justice League: Gods and Monsters, voiced again by Lauren Tom. She was part of Lex Luthor's "Project Fair Play", a weapons program contingency to destroy their universe's Justice League if necessary, until the Metal Men kill her and the other scientists involved.
 Doctor Light makes a minor non-speaking appearance in DC Super Hero Girls: Hero of the Year.

Video games
Doctor Light appears in DC Universe Online.

Web series
Doctor Light makes non-speaking background appearances in DC Super Hero Girls as a student of Super Hero High.

References

External links
 DCU Guide: Doctor Light (Kimiyo Hoshi)
 Incandescent: Losing the Light
 DCAU: Doctor Light (Kimiyo Hoshi)
 ComicVine: Doctor Light (Kimiyo Hoshi)

Comics characters introduced in 1985
Characters created by Marv Wolfman
Japanese superheroes
DC Comics female superheroes
DC Comics metahumans
DC Comics scientists
Fictional physicians
Fictional astronomers
Fictional characters who can manipulate light
Characters created by George Pérez